Vivian Rogers Creighton (19 November 1900 — 12 October 1975) was the chairman of the Land Administration Board (Queensland, Australia) 1953 to 1956,

Biography
Creighton was employed by the Lands Department since 1923 when he was appointed as a Ranger.  He was awarded an MBE for services during World War II and upon discharge in 1945 took up duties as a land commissioner.  He was appointed to the Land Administration Board in 1952 and became chairman of the board in 1953.

Creighton was controversially dismissed by the Gair Labor Government in August 1956 for making public certain information concerning Government conduct.  This information concerned allegations that the Government had demanded payments from pastoralists in order to ensure the extension of pastoral leases, and that these payments had been diverted to Labor Party funds.  The information was the main cause of a Royal Commission that resulted in the then Lands Minister (Tom Foley) losing his post.

Creighton appeared before Parliament on 2 August 1956 to provide the reasons for his decision to divulge the information, stating:

Creighton was subsequently reappointed to the department as Chief Valuer in 1957.    He died on 12 October 1975 aged 74.

References

1900 births
1975 deaths
People from Queensland